The 27th United States Congress was a meeting of the legislative branch of the United States federal government, consisting of the United States Senate and the United States House of Representatives. It met in Washington, D.C. between March 4, 1841, and March 4, 1843, during the one-month presidency of William Henry Harrison and the first two years of the presidency of his successor, John Tyler. The apportionment of seats in the House of Representatives was based on the 1830 United States census. Both chambers had a Whig majority.

Major events

March 4, 1841: William Henry Harrison was inaugurated as President of the United States
April 4, 1841: President Harrison died and Vice President John Tyler became President
 August 16, 1841: President Tyler's veto of a bill to re-establish the Second Bank of the United States led Whig Party members to riot outside the White House in the most violent demonstration on White House grounds in U.S. history.
 May 19, 1842: Dorr Rebellion
 December 17, 1842: Samuel W. Trotti of South Carolina, became the first Italian American to serve in Congress.

Major legislation

 April 19, 1841: Bankruptcy Act of 1841, ch. 9, 
 September 4, 1841: Preemption Act of 1841, ch. 16, 
 August 4, 1842: Armed Occupation Act, 
 August 30, 1842: Tariff of 1842 ("Black Tariff"), ch. 270,

Treaties 
 August 9, 1842: Webster-Ashburton Treaty signed, establishing the United States–Canada border east of the Rocky Mountains.

Party summary

Senate

House of Representatives

Leadership

Senate
 President: John Tyler (W), until April 4, 1841, thereafter vacant
 Presidents pro tempore: William R. King (D), elected March 4, 1841
 Samuel L. Southard (W), elected March 11, 1841
 Willie P. Mangum (W), elected May 31, 1842

House of Representatives
 Speaker: John D. White (W)

Members
This list is arranged by chamber, then by state. Senators are listed in order of seniority, and representatives are listed by district.

Skip to House of Representatives, below

Senate
Senators were elected by the state legislatures every two years, with one-third beginning new six-year terms with each Congress. Preceding the names in the list below are Senate class numbers, which indicate the cycle of their election. In this Congress, Class 1 meant their term began in the last Congress, requiring re-election in 1844; Class 2 meant their term began with this Congress, requiring re-election in 1846; and Class 3 meant their term ended with this Congress, requiring re-election in 1842.

Alabama 
 2. William R. King (D)
 3. Clement C. Clay (D), until November 15, 1841
 Arthur P. Bagby (D), from November 24, 1841

Arkansas 
 2. William Fulton (D)
 3. Ambrose Sevier (D)

Connecticut 
 1. Jabez W. Huntington (W)
 3. Perry Smith (D)

Delaware 
 1. Richard H. Bayard (W)
 2. Thomas Clayton (W)

Georgia 
 2. John Berrien (W)
 3. Alfred Cuthbert (D)

Illinois 
 2. Samuel McRoberts (D)
 3. Richard M. Young (D)

Indiana 
 1. Albert White (W)
 3. Oliver H. Smith (W)

Kentucky 
 2. James T. Morehead (W)
 3. Henry Clay (W), until March 31, 1842
 John J. Crittenden (W), from March 31, 1842

Louisiana 
 2. Alexander Barrow (W)
 3. Alexander Mouton (D), until March 1, 1842
 Charles Conrad (W), from April 14, 1842

Maine 
 1. Reuel Williams (D), until February 15, 1843
 2. George Evans (W)

Maryland 
 1. William Merrick (W)
 3. John L. Kerr (W)

Massachusetts 
 1. Rufus Choate (W)
 2. Isaac C. Bates (W)

Michigan 
 1. Augustus S. Porter (W)
 2. William Woodbridge (W)

Mississippi 
 1. John Henderson (W)
 2. Robert J. Walker (D)

Missouri 
 1. Thomas Benton (D)
 3. Lewis F. Linn (D)

New Hampshire 
 2. Levi Woodbury (D)
 3. Franklin Pierce (D), until February 28, 1842
 Leonard Wilcox (D), from March 1, 1842

New Jersey 
 1. Samuel L. Southard (W), until June 26, 1842
 William L. Dayton (W), from July 2, 1842
 2. Jacob W. Miller (W)

New York 
 1. Nathaniel P. Tallmadge (W)
 3. Silas Wright (D)

North Carolina 
 2. Willie Mangum (W)
 3. William Graham (W)

Ohio 
 1. Benjamin Tappan (D)
 3. William Allen (D)

Pennsylvania 
 1. Daniel Sturgeon (D)
 3. James Buchanan (D)

Rhode Island 
 1. Nathan Dixon (W), until January 29, 1842
 William Sprague (W), from February 18, 1842
 2. James F. Simmons (W)

South Carolina 
 2. John C. Calhoun (D)
 3. William C. Preston (W), until November 29, 1842
 George McDuffie (D), from December 23, 1842

Tennessee 
 1. Alfred O. P. Nicholson (D), until February 7, 1842
 2. vacant

Vermont 
 1. Samuel S. Phelps (W)
 3. Samuel Prentiss (W), until April 11, 1842
 Samuel C. Crafts (W), from April 23, 1842

Virginia 
 1. William C. Rives (W)
 2. William S. Archer (W)

House of Representatives

Alabama 
All representatives were elected statewide on a general ticket.
 . Reuben Chapman (D)
 . George S. Houston (D)
 . Dixon H. Lewis (D)
 . William W. Payne (D)
 . Benjamin Shields (D)

Arkansas 
 . Edward Cross (D)

Connecticut 
 . Joseph Trumbull (W)
 . William W. Boardman (W)
 . Thomas W. Williams (W)
 . Thomas B. Osborne (W)
 . Truman Smith (W)
 . John H. Brockway (W)

Delaware 
 . George B. Rodney (W)

Georgia 
All representatives were elected statewide on a general ticket.
 . Julius C. Alford (W), until October 1, 1841
 Edward J. Black (D), from January 3, 1842
 . William C. Dawson (W), until November 13, 1841
 Walter T. Colquitt (D), from January 3, 1842
 . Thomas F. Foster (W)
 . Roger L. Gamble (W)
 . Richard W. Habersham (W), until December 2, 1842
 George W. Crawford (W), from January 7, 1843
 . Thomas Butler King (W)
 . James Meriwether (W)
 . Eugenius Nisbet (W), until October 12, 1841
 Mark A. Cooper (D), from January 3, 1842
 . Lott Warren (W)

Illinois 
 . John Reynolds (D)
 . Zadok Casey (Ind. D)
 . John T. Stuart (W)

Indiana 
 . George H. Proffit (W)
 . Richard W. Thompson (W)
 . Joseph L. White (W)
 . James H. Cravens (W)
 . Andrew Kennedy (D)
 . David Wallace (W)
 . Henry S. Lane (W)

Kentucky 
 . Linn Boyd (D)
 . Philip Triplett (W)
 . Joseph R. Underwood (W)
 . Bryan Owsley (W)
 . John B. Thompson (W)
 . Willis Green (W)
 . John Pope (W)
 . James Sprigg (W)
 . John White (W)
 . Thomas F. Marshall (W)
 . Landaff W. Andrews (W)
 . Garrett Davis (W)
 . William O. Butler (D)

Louisiana 
 . Edward D. White (W)
 . John B. Dawson (D)
 . John Moore (W)

Maine 
 . Nathan Clifford (D)
 . William P. Fessenden (W)
 . Benjamin Randall (W)
 . David Bronson (W), from May 31, 1841
 . Nathaniel Littlefield (D)
 . Alfred Marshall (D)
 . Joshua A. Lowell (D)
 . Elisha Allen (W)

Maryland 
The 4th district was a plural district with two representatives.
 . Isaac Jones (W)
 . James A. Pearce (W)
 . James W. Williams (D), until December 2, 1842
 Charles S. Sewall (D), from January 2, 1843
 . John P. Kennedy (W)
 . Alexander Randall (W)
 . William Cost Johnson (W)
 . John Mason (D)
 . Augustus R. Sollers (W)

Massachusetts 
 . Robert C. Winthrop (W), until May 25, 1842
 Nathan Appleton (W), from June 9, 1842, until September 28, 1842
 Robert C. Winthrop (W), from November 29, 1842
 . Leverett Saltonstall (W)
 . Caleb Cushing (W)
 . William Parmenter (D)
 . Levi Lincoln Jr. (W), until March 16, 1841
 Charles Hudson (W), from May 3, 1841
 . Osmyn Baker (W)
 . George N. Briggs (W)
 . William B. Calhoun (W)
 . William S. Hastings (W), until June 17, 1842
 . Nathaniel B. Borden (W)
 . Barker Burnell (W)
 . John Quincy Adams (W)

Michigan 
 . Jacob M. Howard (W)

Mississippi 
All representatives were elected statewide on a general ticket.
 . William M. Gwin (D)
 . Jacob Thompson (D)

Missouri 
All representatives were elected statewide on a general ticket.
 . John C. Edwards (D)
 . John Miller (D)

New Hampshire 
All representatives were elected statewide on a general ticket.
 . Charles G. Atherton (D)
 . Edmund Burke (D)
 . Ira A. Eastman (D)
 . John R. Reding (D)
 . Tristram Shaw (D)

New Jersey 
All representatives were elected statewide on a general ticket.
 . John B. Aycrigg (W)
 . William Halstead (W)
 . John P. B. Maxwell (W)
 . Joseph F. Randolph (W)
 . Charles C. Stratton (W)
 . Thomas J. Yorke (W)

New York 
There were four plural districts, the 8th, 17th, 22nd & 23rd had two representatives each, the 3rd had four representatives.
 . Charles A. Floyd (D)
 . Joseph Egbert (D)
 . Charles G. Ferris (D)
 . John McKeon (D)
 . James I. Roosevelt (D)
 . Fernando Wood (D)
 . Aaron Ward (D)
 . Richard D. Davis (D)
 . James G. Clinton (D)
 . John Van Buren (D)
 . Jacob Houck Jr. (D)
 . Robert McClellan (D)
 . Hiram P. Hunt (W)
 . Daniel D. Barnard (W)
 . Archibald L. Linn (W)
 . Bernard Blair (W)
 . Thomas A. Tomlinson (W)
 . Henry Bell Van Rensselaer (W)
 . John Sanford (D)
 . Andrew W. Doig (D)
 . David P. Brewster (D)
 . John G. Floyd (D)
 . Thomas C. Chittenden (W)
 . Samuel S. Bowne (D)
 . Samuel Gordon (D)
 . John C. Clark (W)
 . Samuel Partridge (D)
 . Lewis Riggs (D)
 . Victory Birdseye (W)
 . A. Lawrence Foster (W)
 . Christopher Morgan (W)
 . John Maynard (W)
 . Francis Granger (W), until March 5, 1841
 John Greig (W), from May 21, 1841, until September 25, 1841
 Francis Granger (W), from November 27, 1841
 . William M. Oliver (D)
 . Timothy Childs (W)
 . Seth M. Gates (W)
 . John Young (W)
 . Staley N. Clarke (W)
 . Millard Fillmore (W)
 . Alfred Babcock (W)

North Carolina 
 . Kenneth Rayner (W)
 . John R. J. Daniel (D)
 . Edward Stanly (W)
 . William Washington (W)
 . James I. McKay (D)
 . Archibald H. Arrington (D)
 . Edmund Deberry (W)
 . Romulus M. Saunders (D)
 . Augustine H. Shepperd (W)
 . Abraham Rencher (W)
 . Greene Caldwell (D)
 . James Graham (W)
 . Lewis Williams (W), until February 23, 1842
 Anderson Mitchell (W), from April 27, 1842

Ohio 
 . Nathanael G. Pendleton (W)
 . John B. Weller (D)
 . Patrick Goode (W)
 . Jeremiah Morrow (W)
 . William Doan (D)
 . Calvary Morris (W)
 . William Russell (W)
 . Joseph Ridgway (W)
 . William Medill (D)
 . Samson Mason (W)
 . Benjamin S. Cowen (W)
 . Joshua Mathiot (W)
 . James Mathews (D)
 . George Sweeny (D)
 . Sherlock Andrews (W)
 . Joshua R. Giddings (W), until March 22, 1842, and from December 5, 1842
 . John Hastings (D)
 . Ezra Dean (D)
 . Samuel Stokely (W)

Pennsylvania 
There were two plural districts, the 2nd had two representatives, the 4th had three representatives.
 . Charles Brown (D)
 . George W. Toland (W)
 . John Sergeant (W), until September 15, 1841
 Joseph R. Ingersoll (W), from October 12, 1841
 . Charles J. Ingersoll (D)
 . Jeremiah Brown (W)
 . John Edwards (W)
 . Francis James (W)
 . Joseph Fornance (D)
 . Robert Ramsey (W)
 . John Westbrook (D)
 . Peter Newhard (D)
 . George M. Keim (D)
 . William Simonton (W)
 . James Gerry (D)
 . James Cooper (W)
 . Amos Gustine (D)
 . James Irvin (W)
 . Benjamin A. Bidlack (D)
 . John Snyder (D)
 . Davis Dimock Jr. (D), until January 13, 1842
 Almon H. Read (D), from March 18, 1842
 . Charles Ogle (W), until May 10, 1841
 Henry Black (W), from June 28, 1841, until November 28, 1841
 James M. Russell (W), from December 21, 1841
 . Albert G. Marchand (D)
 . Enos Hook (D), until April 18, 1841
 Henry W. Beeson (D), from May 31, 1841
 . Joseph Lawrence (W), until April 17, 1842
 Thomas M. T. McKennan (W), from May 30, 1842
 . William W. Irwin (W)
 . William Jack (D)
 . Thomas Henry (W)
 . Arnold Plumer (D)

Rhode Island 
Both representatives were elected statewide on a general ticket.
 . Robert B. Cranston (W)
 . Joseph L. Tillinghast (W)

South Carolina 
 . Isaac E. Holmes (D)
 . Robert Rhett (D)
 . John Campbell (D)
 . Sampson H. Butler (D), until September 27, 1842
 Samuel W. Trotti (D), from December 17, 1842
 . Francis W. Pickens (D)
 . William Butler (W)
 . James Rogers (D)
 . Thomas D. Sumter (D)
 . Patrick C. Caldwell (D)

Tennessee 
 . Thomas D. Arnold (W)
 . Abraham McClellan (D)
 . Joseph L. Williams (W)
 . Thomas Campbell (W)
 . Hopkins L. Turney (D)
 . William B. Campbell (W)
 . Robert L. Caruthers (W)
 . Meredith P. Gentry (W)
 . Harvey M. Watterson (D)
 . Aaron V. Brown (D)
 . Cave Johnson (D)
 . Milton Brown (W)
 . Christopher Williams (W)

Vermont 
 . Hiland Hall (W)
 . William Slade (W)
 . Horace Everett (W)
 . Augustus Young (W)
 . John Mattocks (W)

Virginia 
 . Francis Mallory (W)
 . George B. Cary (D)
 . John W. Jones (D)
 . William Goode (D)
 . Edmund W. Hubard (D)
 . Walter Coles (D)
 . William L. Goggin (W)
 . Henry A. Wise (W)
 . Robert M. T. Hunter (W)
 . John Taliaferro (W)
 . John M. Botts (W)
 . Thomas W. Gilmer (W)
 . Linn Banks (D), until December 6, 1841
 William Smith (D), from December 6, 1841
 . Cuthbert Powell (W)
 . Richard W. Barton (W)
 . William Harris (D)
 . Alexander Stuart (W)
 . George W. Hopkins (D)
 . George W. Summers (W)
 . Samuel Hays (D)
 . Lewis Steenrod (D)

Non-voting members 
 . David Levy Yulee (D)
 . Augustus C. Dodge (D)
 . Henry Dodge (D)

Changes in membership
The count below reflects changes from the beginning of the first session of this Congress.

Senate 
 Replacements: 9
 Democrats: no net change
 Whigs: no net change
 Deaths: 2
 Resignations: 8
 Interim appointments: 0
 Vacancy: 1
Total seats with changes: 10

|-
| Alabama(3)
|  | Clement C. Clay (D)
| style="font-size:80%" | Resigned November 15, 1841
|  | Arthur P. Bagby (D)
| Elected November 24, 1841
|-
| Rhode Island(1)
|  | Nathan F. Dixon (W)
| style="font-size:80%" | Died January 29, 1842
|  | William Sprague (W)
| Elected February 18, 1842
|-
| Tennessee(1)
|  | Alfred O. P. Nicholson (D)
| style="font-size:80%" | Resigned February 7, 1842
| Vacant
| Not filled this term
|-
| New Hampshire(3)
|  | Franklin Pierce (D)
| style="font-size:80%" | Resigned February 28, 1842
|  | Leonard Wilcox (D)
| Appointed March 1, 1842, and subsequently elected
|-
| Louisiana(3)
|  | Alexandre Mouton (D)
| style="font-size:80%" | Resigned March 1, 1842, after being elected Governor of Louisiana
|  | Charles M. Conrad (W)
| Appointed April 14, 1842
|-
| Kentucky(3)
|  | Henry Clay (W)
| style="font-size:80%" | Resigned March 31, 1842
|  | John J. Crittenden (W)
| Appointed March 31, 1842, and subsequently elected
|-
| Vermont(3)
|  | Samuel Prentiss (W)
| style="font-size:80%" | Resigned April 11, 1842, to become judge of the U.S. District Court of Vermont
|  | Samuel C. Crafts (W)
| Appointed April 23, 1842, and subsequently elected
|-
| New Jersey(1)
|  | Samuel L. Southard (W)
| style="font-size:80%" | Died June 26, 1842
|  | William L. Dayton (W)
| Appointed July 2, 1842
|-
| South Carolina(3)
|  | William C. Preston (W)
| style="font-size:80%" | Resigned November 29, 1842
|  | George McDuffie (D)
| Elected December 23, 1842
|-
| Maine(1)
|  | Reuel Williams (D)
| style="font-size:80%" | Resigned February 15, 1843
| Vacant
| Not filled this term
|}

House of Representatives 
 Replacements: 17
 Democrats: 3 seat net gain
 Whigs: 3 seat net loss
 Deaths: 8
 Resignations: 12
 Contested election: 1
Total seats with changes: 20

|-
| 
| Vacant
| style="font-size:80%" | Rep. George Evans resigned in previous congress
|  | David Bronson (W)
| Seated May 31, 1841
|-
| 
|  | Francis Granger (W)
| style="font-size:80%" | Resigned March 5, 1841, after being appointed United States Postmaster General
|  | John Greig (W)
| Seated May 21, 1841
|-
| 
|  | Levi Lincoln Jr. (W)
| style="font-size:80%" | Resigned March 16, 1841, after being appointed Collector of the port of Boston
|  | Charles Hudson (W)
| Seated May 3, 1841
|-
| 
|  | Enos Hook (D)
| style="font-size:80%" | Resigned April 18, 1841
|  | Henry W. Beeson (D)
| Seated May 31, 1841
|-
| 
|  | Charles Ogle (W)
| style="font-size:80%" | Died May 10, 1841
|  | Henry Black (W)
| Seated June 28, 1841
|-
| 
|  | John Sergeant (W)
| style="font-size:80%" | Resigned September 15, 1841
|  | Joseph R. Ingersoll (W)
| Seated October 12, 1841
|-
| 
|  | John Greig (W)
| style="font-size:80%" | Resigned September 25, 1841
|  | Francis Granger (W)
| Seated November 27, 1841
|-
| 
|  | Julius C. Alford (W)
| style="font-size:80%" | Resigned October 1, 1841
|  | Edward J. Black (D)
| Seated January 3, 1842
|-
| 
|  | Eugenius A. Nisbet (W)
| style="font-size:80%" | Resigned October 12, 1841
|  | Mark A. Cooper (D)
| Seated January 3, 1842
|-
| 
|  | William C. Dawson (W)
| style="font-size:80%" | Resigned November 13, 1841
|  | Walter T. Colquitt (D)
| Seated January 3, 1842
|-
| 
|  | Henry Black (W)
| style="font-size:80%" | Died November 28, 1841
|  | James M. Russell (W)
| Seated December 21, 1841
|-
| 
|  | Linn Banks (D)
| style="font-size:80%" | Lost contested election December 6, 1841
|  | William Smith (D)
| Seated December 6, 1841
|-
| 
|  | Davis Dimock Jr. (D)
| style="font-size:80%" | Died January 13, 1842
|  | Almon H. Read (D)
| Seated March 18, 1842
|-
| 
|  | Lewis Williams (W)
| style="font-size:80%" | Died February 23, 1842
|  | Anderson Mitchell (W)
| Seated April 27, 1842
|-
| 
|  | Joshua R. Giddings (W)
| style="font-size:80%" | Resigned March 22, 1842, after vote of his censure and re-elected to same seat
|  | Joshua R. Giddings (W)
| Seated December 5, 1842
|-
| 
|  | Joseph Lawrence (W)
| style="font-size:80%" | Died April 17, 1842
|  | Thomas M. T. McKennan (W)
| Seated May 30, 1842
|-
| 
|  | Robert C. Winthrop (W)
| style="font-size:80%" | Resigned May 25, 1842
|  | Nathan Appleton (W)
| Seated June 9, 1842
|-
| 
|  | William S. Hastings (W)
| style="font-size:80%" | Died June 17, 1842
| Vacant
| Not filled this Congress
|-
| 
|  | Sampson H. Butler (D)
| style="font-size:80%" | Resigned September 27, 1842
|  | Samuel W. Trotti (D)
| Seated December 17, 1842
|-
| 
|  | Nathan Appleton (W)
| style="font-size:80%" | Resigned September 28, 1842
|  | Robert C. Winthrop (W)
| Seated November 29, 1842
|-
| 
|  | Richard W. Habersham (W)
| style="font-size:80%" | Died December 2, 1842
|  | George W. Crawford (W)
| Seated January 7, 1843
|-
| 
|  | James W. Williams (D)
| style="font-size:80%" | Died December 2, 1842
|  | Charles S. Sewall (D)
| Seated January 2, 1843
|}

Committees
Lists of committees and their party leaders.

Senate

 Agriculture (Chairman: Lewis F. Linn)
 Audit and Control the Contingent Expenses of the Senate (Chairman: Albert S. White then Benjamin Tappan)
 Claims (Chairman: William A. Graham)
 Commerce (Chairman: Jabez Huntington) 
 Distributing Public Revenue Among the States (Select)
 District of Columbia (Chairman: Richard H. Bayard)
 Finance (Chairman: Clement C. Clay)
 Fiscal Corporation of the United States (Select)
 Foreign Relations (Chairman: William C. Rives then William S. Archer)
 Indian Affairs (Chairman: James T. Morehead then Albert White)
 Judiciary (Chairman: John M. Berrien)
 Manufactures (Chairman: George Evans)
 Military Affairs (Chairman: William C. Preston then John J. Crittenden)
 Militia (Chairman: Samuel S. Phelps)
 Naval Affairs (Chairman: Willie P. Mangum)
 Patents and the Patent Office (Chairman: Samuel Prentiss then John Leeds Kerr then Samuel S. Phelps)
 Pensions (Chairman: Isaac C. Bates)
 Post Office and Post Roads (Chairman: John Henderson)
 Printing (Chairman: N/A)
 Private Land Claims (Chairman: Richard H. Bayard)
 Public Buildings and Grounds (Chairman: Alexander Barrow)
 Public Lands (Chairman: Oliver H. Smith)
 Revolutionary Claims (Chairman: Nathan F. Dixon) 
 Roads and Canals (Chairman: Augustus S. Porter)
 Tariff Regulation (Select)
 Whole

House of Representatives

 Accounts (Chairman: Osmyn Baker)
 Agriculture (Chairman: Edmund Deberry)
 Apportionment of Representatives (Select)
 Claims (Chairman: Joshua Giddings)
 Commerce (Chairman: John P. Kennedy)
 District of Columbia (Chairman: Joseph R. Underwood)
 Elections (Chairman: William Halstead)
 Expenditures in the Navy Department (Chairman: Thomas Jones Yorke)
 Expenditures in the Post Office Department (Chairman: Joshua A. Lowell)
 Expenditures in the State Department (Chairman: John Van Buren)
 Expenditures in the Treasury Department (Chairman: A. Lawrence Foster)
 Expenditures in the War Department (Chairman: James Iver McKay)
 Expenditures on Public Buildings (Chairman: Cave Johnson)
 Foreign Affairs (Chairman: Caleb Cushing then John Quincy Adams)
 Indian Affairs (Chairman: John Quincy Adams)
 Invalid Pensions (Chairman: Calvary Morris)
 Judiciary (Chairman: Daniel D. Barnard)
 Manufactures (Chairman: Leverett Saltonstall I)
 Memorial of the Agricultural Bank of Mississippi (Select)
 Mileage (Chairman: Thomas W. Williams)
 Military Affairs (Chairman: William C. Dawson)
 Militia (Chairman: George May Keim)
 Naval Affairs (Chairman: Henry A. Wise)
 Patents (Chairman: Thomas B. Osborne)
 Post Office and Post Roads (Chairman: George N. Briggs)
 Private Land Claims (Chairman: John Moore)
 Public Buildings and Grounds (Chairman: William W. Boardman)
 Public Expenditures (Chairman: James Graham)
 Public Lands (Chairman: William C. Johnson then Jeremiah Morrow then Reuben Chapman then Jeremiah Morrow)
 Revisal and Unfinished Business (Chairman: Francis James)
 Revolutionary Claims (Chairman: Hiland Hall)
 Revolutionary Pensions (Chairman: John Taliaferro)
 Roads and Canals (Chairman: Joseph Lawrence)
 Rules (Select)
 Standards of Official Conduct
 Territories (Chairman: Garrett Davis)
 Ways and Means (Chairman: Millard Fillmore)
 Whole

Joint committees

 Enrolled Bills (Chairman: Sen. Augustus Porter then Sen. William Sprague)
 The Library (Chairman: N/A)

Employees 
 Librarian of Congress: John Silva Meehan

Senate 
Secretary: Asbury Dickins
Sergeant at Arms: Stephen Haight, until March 8, 1841
 Edward Dyer, elected March 8, 1841
Chaplain: George G. Cookman, Methodist, until June 12, 1841
 Septimus Tustin, Presbyterian, elected June 12, 1841

House of Representatives 
Clerk: Hugh A. Garland, until May 31, 1841
 Matthew St. Clair Clarke, elected May 31, 1841
Sergeant at Arms: Roderick Dorsey, until June 8, 1841
 Eleazor M. Townsend, elected June 8, 1841
Doorkeeper: Joseph Follansbee
Postmaster: William J. McCormick
Chaplain: John W. French, Episcopalian, elected May 31, 1841
 John N. Maffit, Methodist, elected December 6, 1841
 Frederick T. Tiffany, Episcopalian, elected December 5, 1842
 Reading Clerks:

See also 
 1840 United States elections (elections leading to this Congress)
 1840 United States presidential election
 1840–41 United States Senate elections
 1840–41 United States House of Representatives elections
 1842 United States elections (elections during this Congress, leading to the next Congress)
 1842–43 United States Senate elections
 1842–43 United States House of Representatives elections

Notes

References

External links
Statutes at Large, 1789-1875
Senate Journal, First Forty-three Sessions of Congress
House Journal, First Forty-three Sessions of Congress
Biographical Directory of the U.S. Congress
U.S. House of Representatives: House History
U.S. Senate: Statistics and Lists